Teague Moore (born March 24, 1976, in Pittsburgh, Pennsylvania) is an American wrestler and former coach. He is known for his capture of the 1998 NCAA Championship while at Oklahoma State University. He was the head coach at Clarion University of Pennsylvania before spending a decade at American University.

As an NCAA head coach, Moore has been attributed with the founding of the First2Ten rule system used by the Association of Career Wrestlers in Tour ACW events.

Career

High school 
Moore was considered one of the Best High School Wrestlers of the 1990s, according to Intermatwrestle.com. In his years at North Allegheny High School, he was 3X All-State, 2X State Finalist, and a 1X State Champion. He is also a 3X Junior Freestyle National Champion and a NHSCA Senior National Champion.

College 
After graduation from North Allegheny, Moore went to Oklahoma State University. In his years at Oklahoma State, he was a 3X Big 12 Finalist, winning the Big 12 2X. Moore also was a 4X NCAA Qualifier, 3X NCAA All-American. In 1998, Teague captured the 118 lbs Division 1 NCAA Wrestling Championship with a pin over David Morgan of Michigan State University.
While at Oklahoma State he also competed and won the 1996 Espoir (20 & under) National Championships in Freestyle at 125.5 lbs. He defeated Eddie Jayne of Penn State University in the finals.  He represented the USA that summer in Seoul, South Korea on the BIG XII Conference cultural exchange. In 1999 he was second place at the university (24 & under) Nationals in Freestyle at 58 kg, losing to Cody Sanderson of Iowa State in the finals.

International 
In 2000 Moore won the University Nationals in Freestyle at 54 kg.  He defeated 2004 Olympic Silver medalist, Steven Abas of Fresno State, in the finals and was voted Outstanding Wrestler of the competition.  Moore then went on to win Gold at the University World Championships held in Tokyo, Japan. At the 2000 Olympic Trials in Dallas, Texas he took third place becoming a US National Team Member.  He represented the US at the 2001 World Cup of Freestyle Wrestling held in Baltimore, Maryland. During the 2001–02 season he won the Manitoba Open in Canada with a victory over 2000 Olympic Silver Medalist, Sam Henson. That was followed up with a title at the 2002 Yasar Dogu International Open in Ankara, Turkey where he  defeated 2008 Olympic Silver Medalist, Tomihiro Matsunaga of Japan in the finals. He then won the US Open at 55 kg defeating Jody Strittmatter in the finals. Then placed second at the US World Team Trials in Minneapolis, Minnesota.  In 2003 Moore won a silver medal at the World Cup of Freestyle Wrestling held in Boise, Idaho representing the "World Select" team with a victory over 2001 World Bronze Medalist, Alexander Kontoev of Russia. In 2004 he won silver at the Ulan Ude International Open in Ulan Ude, Russia. Moore capped his international career off with a 3rd-place finish at the 2004 US Olympic Trials in Indianapolis, Indiana.

Professional 
Moore took 2nd place in the Real Pro Wrestling series, losing to 2000 Olympic Silver Medalist and 1997 World Champion, Sam Henson.

Coach

History

Personal life 
Moore resides in Maryland. He is very sadly divorced and has three daughters and one son.

Moore donates to the Democratic Party and endorsed Joe Biden in the 2020 Presidential Election.

References

Living people
1976 births
American wrestling coaches
Oklahoma State Cowboys wrestlers
American wrestlers
College wrestling coaches in the United States